IMPACT press was an Orlando, Florida-based magazine started in 1996 by Craig Mazer. IMPACT press ran for 10 years, printing its last issue in Spring 2006. Most of the articles were political in nature and usually supported the left and far left. During its 10 years in existence, IMPACT press printed 60 issues with print runs of at least 10,000 copies each. Copies of the magazine were available in over 50 cities around the United States.

In addition to the political topics, IMPACT also focused on animal rights issues and the environment, as well as including music reviews in a section called "Quickies". Some of the regular contributors to IMPACT included animal rights advocate and author Steven Best, social and political activist Paul Rogat Loeb, cartoonists Keith Knight and Stephanie McMillan, and Morris Sullivan, as well as columnists Adam Finley, Patrick Scott Barnes, Don Pflaster, and others. Additional staff included contributing editor/copy editor Stacey Matrazzo and webmaster Ben Markeson.

References

External links
Official website

1996 establishments in Florida
2006 disestablishments in Florida
Defunct political magazines published in the United States
Magazines established in 1996
Magazines disestablished in 2006
Magazines published in Florida
Mass media in Orlando, Florida
Quarterly magazines published in the United States